The 1949 Los Angeles Dons season was their fourth and final season in the All-America Football Conference. The team failed to improve on their previous output of 7–7, winning only four games. They failed to qualify for the playoffs for the fourth consecutive season and folded with the league after the season.

Season schedule

Division standings

References

Los Angeles Dons seasons
Los Angeles Dons
Los Angeles Dons